Massacre in Trhová Kamenice happened on 8 May 1945 in what is now the Czech Republic. 

German troops, escaping from Chrudim back to Nazi Germany, passed through the village of Trhová Kamenice where they decided to punish supposed partisans. Near the village they first killed five villagers, including Bedřich Mareš. 

On the village borders, the troops found young Marie Pilařová returning from a visit to her relatives. They shot her instantly. They then entered the village, and in the church they captured the parish priest Oldřich Kučera and brutally tortured him to death.

The troops had previously captured four hostages in the near village of Rohozná - Jaroslav Kvapil, Jan Michek (a 17-year-old boy), Janko Trudič and Antonín Novák. The hostages were executed near house number 6. 

Under the nearby hill called Třešňovka, the troops shot three more people - Antonín Alinč, Adolf Zábský and Emanuel Kacafírek, who were trying to escape. They are buried in the Trhová Kamenice cemetery.

There is now a monument in the village to remember the event. Those responsible were never brought to trial.

External links
  List of War Victims
  Chronicles of Trhová Kamenice

Conflicts in 1945
Massacres in 1945
Disasters in Czechoslovakia
Nazi war crimes in Czechoslovakia
Mass murder in 1945
Massacres in the Czech Republic
1945 in Czechoslovakia
Czechoslovakia–Germany relations
May 1945 events